Barbara A. McKinzie was from 2006 to 2010 the  twenty-seventh International President of Alpha Kappa Alpha (ΑΚΑ), the first Greek-lettered sorority established and incorporated by African-American college women.

Born in Oklahoma, McKinzie has a B.S. degree from East Central University as well as an M.B.A. from Northwestern University. Before becoming president, she had various other roles in the sorority. She is a certified public accountant and former Comptroller at the Chicago Housing Authority.

Lawsuit to remove McKinzie 
In July 2009, eight members of ΑΚΑ sued the sorority to have McKinzie removed as president. They alleged that she spent hundreds of thousands of dollars of organization funds on personal items, including jewelry and clothing. Further, the suit alleged that the ΑΚΑ board approved a "pension stipend" of $4,000 a month for four years after McKinzie leaves office without the necessary approval of members, and that a $1 million life insurance policy was purchased for her. McKinzie was also accused of spending $900,000 on a life-sized wax statue of herself. McKinzie responded that $45,000 was actually spent on statues of herself and the sorority's first International President, the late Nellie Quander. McKinzie said the expenses were "consistent with furthering ΑΚΑ's mission," and that the lawsuit was "without merit." The plaintiffs additionally claimed that under McKinzie ΑΚΑ lost large sums in investments. 
In October 2009, legal counsel for ΑΚΑ sent a letter to the plaintiffs' attorneys demanding that a web site supporting the lawsuit be removed from the Internet, but the web site, Friends of the Weeping Ivy, remained online.

After the lawsuit initially had been dismissed, an appeals court found in favour of the plaintiffs and reinstated the lawsuit. A subsequent audit led to findings which supported the assertions raised by the plaintiffs.

According to ΑΚΑ's website, McKinzie has been expelled from the sorority since 2016. The sorority also won an arbitration award of $1.6 million against her, which (as of January 2017) was challenged by McKinzie in court.

References

External links
Uncrowned Queens: Barbara McKinzie
Presidents of Alpha Kappa Alpha Sorority

Year of birth missing (living people)
Living people
East Central University alumni
Kellogg School of Management alumni
People from Ada, Oklahoma
American accountants
Women accountants
African-American businesspeople
Women in finance
American women business executives
American business executives
21st-century African-American people
21st-century African-American women
Alpha Kappa Alpha presidents